Dhoong, part of Narali Union Council,  is the second largest village in Gujar Khan Tehsil, Rawalpindi District, Punjab, Pakistan. Dhoong is a historic village in Rawalpindi District and is noted for its reserves of oil and natural gas.

Educational institutions
 Global Vision Montessori & School Dhoong Campus
 Govt. Boys High School Dhoong
 Govt. Girls High School Dhoong
 Al-Hijra islamic school Dhoong
 Madrissa Touseef-Ul-Quran Dhoong

Hospitals
 Basic Health Unit Dhoong

Post office
 Post Office Dhoong 47770, GPO Gujar Khan

Banks and financial institutions
 Habib Bank Ltd., Dhoong Branch

Telecommunication
The PTCL provides the main network of landline telephones. Many ISPs and all major mobile phone and wireless companies operating in Pakistan provide service in Dhoong.

Languages
 Pothowari and Punjabi are the main languages of Dhoong; other languages are Urdu and English.

Other villages near Dhoong
 Tarati, Ahdi (Union Council), Narali, Daultala, Jatli (Police Station), Dhoke Adra, Dhoke Budhal, Dhoke Cheemian, Dhoke Kanyal, Dhoke Landian, Faryal, Fazolian, Kayal, Thakra Mohra, Mastala, (Dohda, Langah, Domali, Jand- District Chakwal) Dhoke Baba Noor (Dhoke Gujran).Chechen Reyin Gorsin Dhon kesa dokhowa dongi khrod hsola (District Chakwal) Rama tahta kasrain

Transport
 Dhoong is situated on the Daultala – Mulhal Mughlan Road. Gujar Khan is about 18 kilometers away, Rawalpindi - Islamabad is about 45 kilometers, and Chakwal is about 26 kilometers from Dhoong. There are many ways to get around in Dhoong, including public transport, buses, various kinds of private hire vehicle including vans, cars, taxis, and auto-rickshaws, motorcycles, and tractors.

Populated places in Rawalpindi District